Sagna is a commune in Neamț County, Western Moldavia, Romania. It is composed of three villages: Luțca, Sagna and Vulpășești. It also included Gâdinți village until 2004, when it was split off to form Gâdinți Commune.

References

Communes in Neamț County
Localities in Western Moldavia